Chinandega Futbol Clube  is a Nicaraguan football team who play in the Nicaraguan Premier Division.

They play their home games at the Estadio Efraín Tijerino in Chinandega. They have been playing in the top tier since winning promotion in summer 2011.

Current squad
As of:

List of Managers
Chinandega has had  permanent managers since it first appointed TBD as coach in 1976. The longest-serving manager was Reyna Espinoza, who managed Chinandega for four years from Feb 2014 to TBD. Colombian Wilson Gil was the foreign coach in the club. Reyna Espinoza is the first female to coach the men's senior squad.

 Salvador Dubois Leiva (2008–09)
 Reyna Espinoza Morán (2010–2011)
 Vidal Alonso (2011 – Dec 2011)
 Luis Olivares (Jan 2012 – Feb 2012)
 Reyna Espinoza Morán (Feb 2012 – May 2012)
 Adolfo Alejandro Cajina  (June 2012 – Feb 2013)
 Vidal Alonso (Feb 2013 – August 2013)
 Reyna Espinoza Morán (Aug 2013)
 Wilson Gil Yuste (Aug 2013 – Jan 2014)
 Reyna Espinoza Morán (Feb 2014–)

References

External links

 
Football clubs in Nicaragua
1975 establishments in Nicaragua
Association football clubs established in 1975